This is a list of basins, camping grounds, lakes, mountains, mountain passes, outposts, plains, rivers, ruins, settlements, streams, valleys, villages, and other geographical features located in (or partially included in) the sparsely populated Aksai Chin region administered by China and claimed by India as part of Ladakh. The alternate language names of locations in the Aksai Chin area are included for reference.

Man made

Settlements

Highway features 
 Intersections and waysides
 Quanshuigou (泉水沟) – highway wayside
 Tielongtan (T’ieh-lung-t’an) – intersection with road to Wenquan
 Chalukou (岔路口; Fork) – Intersection of road to Tianwendian, Heweitan, and G219. It is possibly also a geology camp supporting nearby prospecting operations.

On some maps, the road intersections in the region are also referred to with the simple named "(blank)岔口" where "(blank)" is the Chinese initial of the destination, and 岔口 simply means "road fork". For example, 天岔口, 河岔口, and 空岔口 for the road forks to Tianwendian, Heweinan, and Kongka Pass respectively. 

 Highway maintenance squad
 No. 509 Highway Maintenance Squad - southeast of Dahongliutan few kilometers inside Indian claim
 No. 635 Highway Maintenance Squad – just north of Xinjiang Tibet provincial border

Camping grounds
Including camping grounds on historical caravan routes in Aksai Chin:

 With improvements (modern & historical)

 Bilongtan – possibly geology camp for mining prospecting
 Dehra Compass (NI44-5, KP8)
 Hajji Langar (NI44-1, LQ5)/Haji Langar (哈吉栏干) (Qara Qāsh)
 Qizil-yilga or Qizil Jilga (NI44-1, LQ1) (克孜勒吉勒干 or 克孜勒吉勒尕)
 Note: Chinese locations are slightly different, see Chalukou above. However, 克孜勒吉勒干 and 克孜勒吉勒尕 are used to signify 2 different valleys nearby. 

 Unimproved
These are simply referred to as halting place which are places with sufficient vegetation, water, or natural shelter to warrant stopping or camping for historical caravans that depended upon beasts of burden.

 Amtogor (NI44) 
 Burtsātāng (NI44-5, LP3)
 Chong-tash (NI44-1, KQ8)
 Dambu Guru / Tang-pu-ku-lu (NI44-9, LN0)
 Digra (NI44-9, LN0)
 Dong-lung (NI44-1, KQ9) (羌隆山口; referred to as a mountain pass in Chinese)
 Dungure (NI44-9, LN1)
 Gunnu / Kun-nu (NI44-5, LN3)
 Huzākhar (NI44-1, LP4) 
 Kongka Seru (NI44-5, LP3)
 Kota Jilga (NI44-5, KP0) (科塔)
 Kyapsang Tardad (NI44-5, LP2)
 Kyrmgo Traggar/Kyrmgō Traggar (NI44-5, LP3)
 Lak Tsung (NI44-1, LP5)
 Mapo Tāng (NI44-1, LQ5)
 Migpāl Kogma (NI44-5, LN2)
 Nischu (NI44-5, LP2) (尼斯楚)
 Nyagzu
 Nyingri (NI44-5, LN2)
 Palong Karpo (NI44-1, LQ3)
 Panglung (NI44-5, KP9) (班隆)
 Samzungling (NI44-5, KP9) (萨木崇岭)
 Shinglung (NI44-1, KP9)
 Shor-jilga (NI44-1, KQ5)
 Sirijap (NI44-9, KN9)
 Stathrao (NI44-5, LN2)
 Sumdo (NI44-1, KP8) 
 Sumna (NI44-1, LQ2)
 Sumnal (NI44-1, KQ8)
 Tagda-koram-davan (NI44-1, LQ1)
 Tak-marpo (NI44-1, LQ0)
 Tsotāng (NI44-5, LP4)
 Yangpa (NI44)
 Yapchan (NI44-1, LQ1)
 Yūla (NI44-9, LN0)
 Zālung Seru (NI44-5, LP4)

Topographical features

Plains and basins
 Chang Tang (NI44-1, LQ1)
 Chorten Tang (NI44-1, KQ4)
 Depsang Plains
 Lingzi Tāng (Lingzhithang, Lingzhithāng Plains, Ling-shi-tang) (NI44-5, LP2) , 
 Mangrik Basin (NI44-1, LQ5) (肖尔克谷地; Xiaoerke Valley; different name)
 Shu Lungspo Thang (NI44-1, KQ6) (楚隆斯帕坦)
 Thaldat basin (NI44-1, LQ6)

Mountain passes
'Dawan' and 'La' refer to a mountain pass.
 Āne La (NI44-9, KN9)
 Aq-qum Dawān (NI44)
 Chānglung Barma La (NI44-5, LP1)
 Chānglung La (NI44-5, KP9)
 Kyungang La/Chungang La (NI44-5, LN2)
 Dehra La  (NI44-5, KP9)
 Domjor La (NI44-5, LN2)
 Kara-tāgh Dawān (NI44-1, KQ6)
 Khitai Davan (NI44-1, KQ6)/Khitai Dawān/Khitai Dawan
 Kone La (NI44-5, LN5)/Domjar La
 Kongka Pass (NI44-5, LN2)
 Konka La (NI44) (科尼山口)
 Lanak La (NI44-6) 
 Mabdo La/Mobdo La (NI44-5, LP2)
 Mapo-thang Pass (NI44-1, LQ4)/Mapo-thang La
 Qisil Davan (NI44-1, LQ2)
 Qizil Dawan (NI44-1, LP3)
 Rezang La (NI44-9, LN0)
 Spanggur Gap (NI44-9, KN9)
 Stathrao La (NI44-5, LN2)
 Toglung Marpo La (NI44-5, LN3) 
 Yūla La (NI44-9, LN0)

Lakes
 Aksai Chin Lake
 Bilongtan
 Pangong Tso
 Spanggur Tso (NI44-9, LN0)
 Surigh Yilganing Kol (Surigh-yilganing Köl) (NI44-6)
 Tianshuihai
 Tso Tang (NI44-5, LP4)/Tso Thang

Mountains

 Chāng Chenmo Range (NI44-1, KN6)
 Chorten-ri (NI44-1, KQ6)
 Kunlun Mountains
 Monte Della Piega (NI44-1, LQ1)
 Qara-tagh (NI44-1, KQ7)
 Takhta-ri (NI44-1, KQ5)
 Western Loqzung Mountains (NI44-1, LQ0)
 Xiluokezong Shan (NI44-6, about 34°50'N, 79°45'E)

Rivers and streams
 Ang (NI44-9, LN1)
 Ān Zurma / Ānsurma (NI44-9, LN0)
 Chang Chenmo River
 Chānglung (NI44-5, KP9 & LP0)
 Chūmesang  (NI44-5, LN1)
 Drokpo Karpo (NI44-5, LN2)
 Galwan River (NI44-5, LP0)
 Karakash River (Qara Qāsh River)
 Kiu (NI44-9, LN0)
 Kugrung River (NI44-5, KP9)
 Kyapsang (NI44-5, LP1) (different name possibly from Tibetan)
 Lubang Kongma (NI44-5, LN1)
 Nertse (NI44-5, LN3)
 Omalung (NI44-9, LN1)
 Pangsher (NI44-9, LN1)
 Qara-tagh-su (NI44-1, KQ6)
 Ramjor (NI44-5, LN1)
 Sachuk Kongma (NI44-5, LN2)
 Silung Barma (NI44-5, LN1)
 Silung Kongma (NI44-5, LN1)
 Skyangzum (NI44-9, LN0)
 Stathrao (NI44-5, LN3)
 Surlah (NI44-9, LN0)
 Thaldat (NI44-1, LQ4)
 Toglung Marpo (NI44-5, LN4)

Valleys and gorges
'Lungpa' refers to a valley or stream
 Burtsa Lungpa (NI44-1, KQ7)
 Chānglung Lungpa (NI44-9, LN1), also called Chang Parma or Chang Barma
 Chorten Lungpa (NI44-1, KQ5)
 Kone Rong (NI44-5, LN4)
 Lungnak Lungpa (NI44-1, KQ3)
 Migpal Lungpa (Chumesang valley, NI 44-5, LN2)
 Pilung Lungpa (NI44-9, KN9)
 Rezang Lungpa (NI44-9, LN0)
 Samar Lungpa (NI44-1, KQ3)
 Shamal Lungpa (NI44-5, LP1)
 Skydpo Lungpa (NI44-6, just below 35°00'N, 79°45'E)
 Sum-dzom Lungpa (NI44-1, KQ7)
 Takhta Lungpa (NI44-1, KQ6)
 Valle Ignota (NI44-1, LQ1)
 Yamar Lungpa (NI44-1, KQ7)
 Yūla Lungpa (NI44-9, LN0)

Notes

References

 

Locations
Geography of Ladakh
Geography of Tibet
Geography of Xinjiang
History of Ladakh
History of the Republic of India
Hotan Prefecture
Ladakh
Lists of places
Territorial disputes of China
Territorial disputes of India
Aksai Chin, Locations in